Roy and Royce is the Zimbabwean twin singing duo of Roy and Royce Gomo. They gained popularity during the Urban Grooves movement of Zimbabwe and have recorded under Galaxy Entertainment and their own label, Twin Peaks Recordings.

The twins took music lessons from form 1-4 at Gokomere High School and later recorded at Old International radio. They started off as a trio with their friend, Misheck Chikaka, in a group called ROMIRO. It was short-lived, however, and the twins and Chikaka went their separate ways.

The pair kicked off their music career with their hit "Handirege" in 2002, immediately followed by "Zuva Rangu". Both tracks reached number 1 on Zimbabwean music charts. They went on to release a full album entitled Gogogoi, which went on to produce three more hits, including the title track.

The duo's follow-up album from 2003, Tenda, with four hit songs.

Discography

Production

References

Living people
Musical duos
Year of birth missing (living people)
Zimbabwean musical groups